Víctor Pecci Sr. (born October 15, 1955) is a former professional tennis player from Paraguay.

He was ranked as high as world No. 9 in singles in 1980 and world No. 31 in doubles in 1984. Pecci is famous for reaching the 1979 French Open final. He beat Guillermo Vilas 6–0, 6–2, 7–5 in the quarterfinals and Jimmy Connors 7–5, 6–4, 5–7, 6–3 in the semifinals, but lost to three-time champion Björn Borg in the final. He also reached the semifinals in 1981 and was runner-up in Rome. Pecci won the French Open boys' singles in 1973.

Grand Slam finals

Singles: 1 (1 runner-up)

Grand Slam singles performance timeline

Note: The Australian Open was held twice in 1977, in January and December.

Career finals

Singles: 22 (10 titles, 12 runner-ups)

Doubles: 18 (12 titles, 6 runner-ups)

External links
 
 
 

1955 births
Living people
French Open junior champions
Paraguayan male tennis players
Paraguayan people of Italian descent
Sportspeople from Asunción
Grand Slam (tennis) champions in boys' singles